Boreoiulus is a genus of millipedes in the family Blaniulidae, containing the following species:
Boreoiulus dollfusi (Brölemann, 1894)
Boreoiulus simplex Brölemann, 1921
Boreoiulus tenuis (Bigler, 1913)

References

Julida